Lake Proctor may refer to several places:
 Proctor Lake in West Central Texas
 Lake Proctor Wilderness Area in Seminole County, FL